The Church of St John the Baptist, Saint-Jean-de-Luz is a Roman Catholic church in the commune of Saint-Jean-de-Luz, in the French department of Pyrénées-Atlantiques.

History
Louis XIV was married in the church on 9 June 1660.

Architecture
The church is known for its monumental altarpiece, in carved gilded wood, that occupies the entire height of the back wall of the apse, and the two wings that flank it.

The church has been a Monument historique since 1931.

Gallery

References

Monuments historiques of Nouvelle-Aquitaine
Roman Catholic churches in France